Arresting Behavior is an American sitcom that aired on ABC from August 18 to September 2, 1992.

Synopsis
The series centered on partners Bill Ruskin and Donny Walsh who were followed by hand-held cameras as they worked in Vista Valley, California. It parodied the then-new genre of police reality shows such as Cops.

Cast
Leo Burmester as Officer Bill Ruskin
Chris Mulkey as Officer Pete Walsh
Ron Eldard as Officer Donny Walsh
Joey Simmrin as Seth Ruskin
Amy Hathaway as Rhonda Ruskin
Lee Garlington as Connie Ruskin
Eric Balfour as Bill Ruskin Jr.

Episodes

References

External links

1990s American sitcoms
1990s American police comedy television series
1992 American television series debuts
1992 American television series endings
American Broadcasting Company original programming
Television shows set in California
English-language television shows
Television series by HBO Independent Productions